Henry Alfred Mullins (August 27, 1861 – July 8, 1952) was a Canadian exporter, farmer, and politician.

Born in Oswestry, England, the son of James and Margaret Mullins, Mullins was educated in Lindsay, Ontario. In 1899, he was elected as the Conservative candidate to the Legislative Assembly of Manitoba for the electoral district of Russell. During World War I, he was a Colonel, Inspector of Supplies and Transport. He was first elected to the House of Commons of Canada for the Manitoba electoral district of Marquette in the 1925 federal election. A Conservative, he was defeated in the 1926 federal election. He was elected again in the 1930 election. In 1935, he was summoned to the Senate of Canada for the senatorial division of Marquette, Manitoba on the advice of Prime Minister R. B. Bennett. He retired in 1950.

A Methodist, he married Annie M. Langrill in 1885. They had two daughters.

References
 
 

1861 births
1952 deaths
Canadian Methodists
Canadian senators from Manitoba
Conservative Party of Canada (1867–1942) MPs
Progressive Conservative Party of Manitoba MLAs
Members of the House of Commons of Canada from Manitoba
Canadian military personnel of World War I
People from Oswestry